General Housni Benslimane (born  14 December 1935, El Jadida) is a senior Moroccan Gendarmerie officer who has served since 1972 as the Commander-in-Chief of this unit. He also presides over the Moroccan Olympic Committee and was president of the Moroccan FA between 1994 and 2009.

Housni Benslimane played football for Moroccan club AS FAR serving as goalkeeper between 1958 and 1961.

Family
Housni Benslimane is the son of Abdelkrim Benslimane the cousin of El Fatmi BenSlimane, the Pacha of Fes during the French protectorate era. He is also the nephew of Abdelkrim al-Khatib, uncle of Ismail Alaoui, the former president of the Party of Progress and Socialism and cousin of Saad Hassar.

One of his cousins (Mohamed Benslimane grandson of Fatmi Benslimane by his son Toufik and Lalla Badra, the daughter of Moulay Hassan, a friend of Mohammed V who married an alaouite princess) is married to Princess Lalla Zineb, the sister of Prince Moulay Hicham of Morocco.

See also
Abdelaziz Bennani

References

Living people
1935 births
Moroccan generals
People from El Jadida
Sport in Morocco
Morocco at the Olympics
People of Moroccan intelligence agencies
Moroccan footballers
Association football goalkeepers
AS FAR (football) players